Sullamussalam Science College is an aided college affiliated to the University of Calicut, approved by the University Grants Commission and re-accredited with 'A' grade by the National Assessment and Accreditation Council (NAAC). A kilometre away from Areekode on the Vazhakkad Road, the college campus is located on the picturesque hills of Perumparamba on the bank of the Chaliyar.

The college is run by the Muslim Educational Association (MEA), an educational organisation formed in 1994. Jamiyyathul Mujahideen, Areekode, an organisation formed in 1944 is the parent body of the MEA. The college is founded with the objective of imparting education to backward minority communities in rural areas of malabar in general and of Malappuram district in particular.

History 
The college had a modest beginning in 1995 with 72 students in three courses – Bsc. Computer Science, Bsc. Mathematics, B.A English Literature. In 1999 the government sanctioned to the college a Bsc. Physics course. The college sanctioned a postgraduate course in Computer Science in 2000. In 2003, the college started the M.A course in English, and in 2004 MSc. Physics and MSc. Mathematics, all in the unaided sector. By starting the B.Com course with Computer Application in 2006 in self-financing sector, a new branch was added besides arts and science.

In 2013, B.A Economics and B.A Islamic Finance were started, of which the latter is funded by the UGC. The college also started offering B.A Islamic Finance, a program sanctioned and funded by UGC in 2013. In 2014, the college started offering two B.Voc courses in Journalism and software technology.

See also

References

External links 
 

Arts and Science colleges in Kerala
Colleges affiliated with the University of Calicut
Universities and colleges in Malappuram district
1995 establishments in Kerala
Educational institutions established in 1995